Cyril Papa (born February 14, 1984) is a French professional ice hockey winger who is currently a player-coach for Chevaliers du Lac d'Annecy of the FFHG Division 2.

Papa previously played for Brûleurs de Loups, Ours de Villard-de-Lans and HC Morzine-Avoriaz before joining Annecy in 2016. He also played in the 2009 IIHF World Championship for France.

References

External links

1984 births
Living people
Brûleurs de Loups players
French ice hockey left wingers
HC Morzine-Avoriaz players
Ours de Villard-de-Lans players
Sportspeople from La Tronche